Back to Work: Why We Need Smart Government for a Strong Economy is a 2011 non-fiction book by former United States President Bill Clinton. Praise appeared in publications such as the Los Angeles Times and the New York Journal of Books, while publications such as The Guardian published more mixed reviews.

Contents
Clinton writes that the American government faces considerable challenges that it is fundamentally struggling to deal with, problems affecting culture and society as well as the current economy. He argues that Americans "have to get back in the future business." He specifically blames a mindset articulated by ideological conservatives and their allies in the modern Republican Party, particularly those connected to the Tea Party movement, for emphasizing cutting government spending and lowering regulations over what he sees as pragmatic government actions that create economic growth and prosperity. Rather than having an inherently anti-government mindset that causes Americans to "hog-tie ourselves", Clinton states that they "need a strong, effective private sector and a strong, effective government that work together".

He describes various areas such as high-school graduations where the U.S. has fallen behind compared to other countries. Clinton concludes, "Over the last three decades, whenever we’ve given in to blame the government for all our problems, we’ve lost our commitment to shared prosperity, balanced growth, financial responsibility, and investment in the future." He criticizes both American parties for not being up to the task of fighting the major economic slowdown, though he writes from a lens of clear sympathy for President Barack Obama and the Congressional Democrats in the face of Republican opposition. "From 1981 to 2009," he writes, looking back to the economy pre-recession, "the greatest accomplishment of the anti-government Republicans was not to reduce the size of the federal government but to stop paying for it."

In terms of specific policies, Clinton advocates changes such as raising the cap on Social Security taxes, reducing military-related spending, and reforming the payment system to medical providers in the Medicare and Medicaid programs. As well, he discusses fighting loopholes in the U.S. tax code, citing how ExxonMobil made $10.7 billion in profits during the second quarter of 2011 with an effective tax rate of only 17.6% (less than the average tax rate of 20.4% for individual Americans). He broadly writes in support of the viewpoints of the bipartisan Simpson-Bowles Commission.

Reviews and response
The Guardian published a mixed review, with author Erik Tarloff arguing that "the book is almost devoid of human interest or any hint of the man's vivid, outsize personality" but also that Clinton had sounded "informed, high-minded, intelligent and persuasive" in making policy recommendations. He viewed parts of the book as "deadly dull" with others "shrewd and convincing", and he claimed that only "in a country whose notionally conservative party has gone so far off the rails would anyone even have bothered to write it." Tarloff also wrote, "Everything in it is worthy, but only a wonk (or a reviewer) would want to read it to the end."

Financial journalist Andrew Rosenbaum praised the work for the New York Journal of Books. He wrote, "President Clinton offers straightforward policy options, supported by statistics and documentation— and what a welcome bit of refreshment this is". He also lauded the book's "extremely detailed" points of policy advice.

The Los Angeles Times also published a supportive review. Reporter Carolyn Kellogg wrote that Clinton had authored "a book with the chutzpah that the Democrats have been missing." She also remarked,

Award nomination
The audiobook version of this book was nominated for the 55th Grammy Awards in the category of Best Spoken Word Album.

See also

Presidency of Bill Clinton
Simpson-Bowles Commission
Clintonomics
Giving: How Each of Us Can Change the World

References

External links
Discussion with Bill Clinton about Back to Work, November 8, 2011

2011 non-fiction books
Books by Bill Clinton
Books about economic policy
American political books
Non-fiction books about elections
Alfred A. Knopf books
Books written by presidents of the United States